Elections to the local bodies in Uttarakhand, India, are conducted once in five years to elect the representatives to the urban and rural local bodies. These elections are conducted by the Uttarakhand State Election Commission and were mandated by the 74th Constitutional Amendment Act to ensure local government in urban and rural areas.

Urban local bodies in Uttarakhand

Urban local bodies include 8 Municipal Corporations, 41 Municipal Councils, 43 Nagar Panchayats and 9 Cantonment Boards.

Elections are not held in the nagar panchayats of Badrinath, Kedarnath and Gangotri due to their status of temporary settlements. Local interim administration councils administer these three pilgrimage sites for a period of six months during the summers.

Additionally, elections in the Cantonment Boards are conducted by the Ministry of Defence, Union Government of India.

Rural local bodies in Uttarakhand

Rural local bodies include 13 District Councils, 95 Block Development Councils and 7793 Gram Panchayats.

Previous elections
The first general election to the local bodies after statehood in Uttarakhand were held in 2003. Subsequent elections were conducted in 2008, 2013, 2014, 2018 and 2019.

2018–19 Urban local body elections

2019 Rural local body elections

See also
 Local government in India
 Elections in Uttarakhand

References

External links 

Uttarakhand